Callithomia lenea is a species of butterfly of the family Nymphalidae. It is found in Central and South America.

Subspecies
Callithomia lenea lenea (Surinam, French Guiana, Venezuela)
Callithomia lenea zelie (Guérin-Méneville, [1844]) (Bolivia, Peru, Brazil: Acre)
Callithomia lenea xantho (C. & R. Felder, 1860) (Brazil: Bahia)
Callithomia lenea epidero (Bates, 1862) (Brazil: Pará)
Callithomia lenea agrippina (Hewitson, 1863) (Colombia, Panama)
Callithomia lenea alpho (C. & R. Felder, 1865) (Venezuela)
Callithomia lenea pulcheria (Hewitson, 1870) (Ecuador)
Callithomia lenea obfuscata Butler, 1873 (Brazil: Amazonas)
Callithomia lenea methonella (Weymer, 1875) (Brazil: Santa Catarina), Paraguay)
Callithomia lenea fumantis (Haensch, 1909) (Colombia)
Callithomia lenea siparia (Kaye, 1922) (Trinidad)
Callithomia lenea inturna (Fox, 1941) (Peru)
Callithomia lenea travassosi d'Almeida, 1958 (Brazil: Mato Grosso)

In addition, there are three unnamed subspecies from Venezuela.

References

Butterflies described in 1779
Ithomiini
Fauna of Brazil
Nymphalidae of South America
Taxa named by Pieter Cramer